The Wekiwa siltsnail or Wekiwa spring snail, scientific name Floridobia wekiwae, is a species of small freshwater snail with an operculum, an aquatic gastropod mollusk in the family Hydrobiidae. This species is endemic to the United States; it is named after the Wekiwa River in Florida.

References

Molluscs of the United States
Hydrobiidae
Floridobia
Taxonomy articles created by Polbot